Phyllonorycter chiclanella is a moth of the family Gracillariidae. It is known from Spain, Portugal and Madeira.

The larvae feed on Populus alba. They mine the leaves of their host plant. They create a mine that is identical to the mine of Phyllonorycter comparella.

References

chiclanella
Moths of Europe
Moths described in 1859